The Col. Jonathan Tyng House was a historic house on Tyng Road in Tyngsborough, Massachusetts.  The oldest portion of this gambrel-roofed wood-frame house was built c. 1675 by Colonel Jonathan Tyng, the son of Edward Tyng for whom Tyngsborough is named.  The house had a number of pre-Georgian features, including portholes under the eaves, through which muskets could be fired at attackers, and brick lining in the walls.  The upper level also had quarters that were used by the Tyngs to house slaves.  The property was listed on the National Register of Historic Places in 1977;  it was destroyed by fire in Aug 11,1977
.

See also
National Register of Historic Places listings in Middlesex County, Massachusetts

References

Houses completed in 1675
Houses on the National Register of Historic Places in Middlesex County, Massachusetts
Tyngsborough, Massachusetts
Demolished buildings and structures in Massachusetts
1675 establishments in Massachusetts